Edmund Lushington may refer to:
 Edmund Law Lushington, British classical scholar
 Edmund Henry Lushington, Chief Justice of Ceylon